Crowded House is a rock band that was formed in Melbourne, Australia, in 1985. They were founded by Neil Finn and Paul Hester of the New Zealand group Split Enz. Most Split Enz fans shifted their allegiance to the new group, so Crowded House had an established fan base before they had recorded any material. The band has released six studio albums: Crowded House (1986), Temple of Low Men (1988), Woodface (1991), Together Alone (1993), Time on Earth (2007) and Intriguer (2010). The band dissolved in 1996, and reformed in 2007. Crowded House has won awards both nationally and internationally, including twelve ARIA Music Awards from the Australian Recording Industry Association, and eight APRA Awards from the Australasian Performing Right Association. APRA also listed their track, "Don't Dream It's Over," as the seventh best Australian song of all time in May 2001.

Crowded House has performed in several venues, and have become well known among both fans and the music industry both for their music and the skill of the individual members. Their most awarded work is "Don't Dream It's Over" (1986), from their debut album. The song has earned two ARIA Music Awards, three APRA Awards, a BMI Award, and an MTV Music Video Award. In 1998 it was placed 76th on the Triple J Hottest 100 of All Time. They have also had two other songs in annual Hottest 100 lists of best songs from a year. Crowded House won the BRIT Award for Best International Group in 1994.

Crowded House has won twelve trophies from 35 nominations since the ARIA Music Awards were first presented in 1987, including being the first winners of the Best New Talent and Song of the Year categories in that year. The group's success has been across several categories; they received their most nominations (eight) in the Best Group category, winning in 1988 and 1993. Eight of their ARIA Awards were from their first two albums, Crowded House and Temple of Low Men, with the line-up of Finn, Hester and Nick Seymour. Crowded House has won eight APRA Awards in various categories, including three wins in "most-performed" categories from various genres and three wins for either the Gold Award (for best song of the year) or Song of the Year (category renamed from 1991).

The New Zealand Music Awards have been conferred annually since 1965 by Recorded Music NZ. Crowded House has received five nominations, primarily in the category of International Achievement, winning in 1992, 1994 and 1995.

Australian Record Industry Association (ARIA) Awards

Australasian Performing Right Association (APRA) Awards

Mo Awards
The Australian Entertainment Mo Awards (commonly known informally as the Mo Awards), were annual Australian entertainment industry awards. They recognise achievements in live entertainment in Australia from 1975 to 2016. Crowded House won two awards in that time.
 (wins only)
|-
| 1991
| Crowded House
| Rock Performer of the Year
| 
|-
| 1994
| Crowded House 
| Rock Performer of the Year
| 
|-

New Zealand Music Awards

Other awards and accolades

See also

Crowded House discography – includes sales certifications

References

Awards
Lists of awards received by Australian musician
Lists of awards received by musical group